This is a list of Algerian Ligue Professionnelle 1 players (soccer/football) who have made 200 or more appearances in the Algerian Ligue Professionnelle 1. Statistics are updated as of 17 June 2022.

Key
bold Players with this background are still playing in the Algerian Ligue Professionnelle 1.
The name used for each club is the name they had when player most recently played a league match for them. 
Seasons =  number of seasons a player had participated in Algerian Ligue Professionnelle 1; Years = a span between the first and most recent year a player had played a match in Algerian Ligue Professionnelle 1

List of players

Foreign players with most appearances

Gallery

Notes

References

        
Algerian Ligue Professionnelle 1 players
Association football player non-biographical articles